Trichaulax is a genus of flowering plants belonging to the family Acanthaceae.

Its native range is Eastern Tropical Africa.

Species:
 Trichaulax mwasumbii Vollesen

References

Acanthaceae
Acanthaceae genera